The Women's Coronation Procession was a suffragette march through London, England, on 17 June 1911, just before King George V's coronation, demanding women's suffrage in the coronation year. The march was organised by the Women's Social and Political Union (WSPU).  It was "the largest women’s suffrage march ever held in Britain and one of the few to draw together the full range of suffrage organisations".

Some 40,000 people marched from Westminster to the Albert Hall in South Kensington. Charlotte Despard and Flora Drummond on horseback led the march, which included Marjery Bryce dressed as Joan of Arc and 700 women and girls clothed in white to represent suffragette prisoners.

Kate Harvey, Edith Downing and Marion Wallace-Dunlop were among the organisers, and Lolita Roy is believed to have been as well. Jane Cobden organised the Indian women's delegation.

The presence of a substantial number of marchers, both clergymen and lay women, under the banner of the Church League for Women's Suffrage was remarked upon by the Church Times.

Elsie Hooper and other members of the National Association of Women Pharmacists joined the march. In June 1911 the Chemist and Druggist carried photographs of women pharmacists in the march and reported "Miss Elsie Hooper, B.Sc., was in the Science Section, and several other women pharmacists did the two-and-a-half hours’ march.”

See also
Mud March, 1907 suffrage procession in London
Women's Sunday, 1908 suffrage march and rally in London
Suffrage Hikes, 1912 to 1914 in the US
Woman Suffrage Procession, 1913 suffrage march in Washington, D.C.
Great Pilgrimage, 1913 suffrage march in the UK
Silent Sentinels, 1917 to 1919 protest in Washington, D.C.
Selma to Montgomery march, 1965 suffrage march in the US

References

June 1911 events
Women's suffrage in the United Kingdom
1913 in the United Kingdom
Parades in the United Kingdom
1911 in London
Protest marches
1911 in women's history